Estádio Cornélio de Barros, also known as Salgueirão, is a stadium in Salgueiro, Brazil. It has a capacity of 11,000 spectators.  It is the home of Salgueiro Atlético Clube of the Campeonato Brasileiro Série C.

References

Football venues in Pernambuco
Estadio Cornelio De Barros